Fursan Hispania Football Club is an Emirati football club that started as an academy in Al Sufouh, Dubai. They currently play in the UAE First Division League, after promotion from the Second Division in the 2021–22 season.

History
In 2014, former Real Madrid defender Míchel Salgado founded a football academy in 2014 to help develop potential footballers in the United Arab Emirates. In 2020, Salgado formed a partnership with Belhoul to form a professional team to join the newly-established UAE Second Division League.

They finished in first place in the 2021–22 UAE Division 2, gaining promotion to the UAE First Division League, the second tier of football in the United Arab Emirates.

Current squad

Honours
UAE Second Division League
Winner (1): 2021–22

References

Football clubs in Dubai
Football clubs in the United Arab Emirates
Association football clubs established in 2020
2014 establishments in the United Arab Emirates